NA-95 Faisalabad-I is a constituency for the National Assembly of Pakistan.

Members of Parliament

2018-2022: NA-101 Faisalabad-I

Election 2002 

General elections were held on 10 Oct 2002. Ghulam Rasool Sahi of PML-Q won by 55,464 votes.

Election 2008 

General elections were held on 14 Feb 2008. Tariq Mehmood Bajwa of Pakistan Peoples Party Parliamentarians was elected to the National Assembly.

Election 2013 

The result of general election 2013 in this constituency is given below.

Result 
Ghulam Rasool Sahi succeeded in the election 2013 and became the member of National Assembly.

Election 2018 
General elections were held on 25 July 2018.

See also
NA-94 Chiniot-II
NA-96 Faisalabad-II

References

External links
 Election result's official website

NA-075